The  was an AC electric multiple unit (EMU) train type formerly operated by Japanese National Railways (JNR) and later Hokkaido Railway Company (JR Hokkaido) on limited express services in Hokkaido, Japan, between 1980 and 2007.

Operations

 Ishikari (1980)
 Lilac (1 October 1980 – 30 September 2007)
 White Arrow (3 March 1986 – August 1990)
 Suzuran (1 July 1992 – 30 September 2007)
 Airport Rapid (1992 – 15 March 2002)

Formations

4-car sets (1986–2007)

Cars 1 and 3 were each fitted with one N-PS785 single-arm pantograph (from 2004 onward).

6-car sets (1980–1986)

Cars 1, 3, and 5 were each fitted with one PS102B scissors-type pantograph.

6-car Doraemon Undersea Train set L7 (2003–2006)

Cars 1, 3, and 5 were each fitted with one N-PS785 single-arm pantograph.

Interior
The 781 series trainsets did not include Green class (first class) accommodation, but from March to June 2001, improved "u-Seat" seating was added to half of car 4 for reserved seat passengers. All other cars were normally designated as non-reserved seating.

History

The 781 series electric multiple unit was designed specifically for limited express services on electrified lines in the Sapporo area of Hokkaido, to replace the 485-1500 series EMUs first introduced on Ishikari services in 1975, but which proved unreliable in the harsh winter conditions of Hokkaido.

A pre-production 6-car set, classified 781-900 series, was delivered in November 1978. The body was based on the JNR 485 series design, with a more rounded profile to prevent snow adhering, and the electrical systems were based on the earlier 711 series suburban EMU.

Seven full-production 6-car sets were delivered from 1980, with minor improvements including the abolishment of two opening windows on each side. The pre-production set was modified to bring it in line with full production standards in October 1981.

The eight 6-car sets were reformed into twelve 4-car sets to cope with increased service frequency from the November 1986 timetable revision. This entailed converting eight MoHa 781 and SaHa 780 cars into KuMoHa 781-100 and KuHa 780-100 cars respectively by adding new cab ends.

A second side door was added to the KuHa 780 and SaHa 780 cars between 1991 and 1993 to reduce station dwell times. The MoHa 781 cars of sets L1 to L7 only were similarly treated in 1993.

Trains were repainted from the original JNR livery into a new livery based on that of the Super Tokachi between February 1992 and March 1993.

Improved "u-Seat" reserved seating accommodation (rows 1 to 7) was added to half of car 4 between March and June 2001.

Each car was painted a different colour and decorated with Doraemon characters. This operated until August 2006. The set was subsequently scrapped together with the two stored cars from former set L104.

The remainder of the fleet was withdrawn in September 2007.

Preserved examples
A complete 4-car set, consisting of cars KuHa 780-2, SaHa 780-4, MoHa 780-4, and KuMoHa 781-2, is preserved, minus the bogies, at Kikyo Kindergarten in Hakodate, Hokkaido.

References

Electric multiple units of Japan
Hokkaido Railway Company
Train-related introductions in 1978
20 kV AC multiple units
Kawasaki multiple units
Hitachi multiple units